Eocarcinus praecursor is a Jurassic species of decapod crustacean, sufficiently distinct from its relatives to be placed in its own family (Eocarcinidae). Often considered the oldest true crab, it was considered by a 2010 study to be an early member of the Anomura. However, a reanalysis in 2020 again found it to be the earliest known stem-group crab.

Distribution
It lived during the early Pliensbachian age (Lower Jurassic), and has been found in rocks at two sites in the United Kingdom – Mickelton Tunnel (near Aston Magna), Gloucestershire and Runswick Bay, Yorkshire.

Description
In many of its characters, it represents a transitional stage between the Glypheoidea and the Middle Jurassic crabs in the Prosopidae. Since its ancestors were long-tailed decapods, and its successors were short-tailed crabs, Eocarcinus has been described as "the lobster who decided to become a crab". Previously considered to be the oldest known true crab, a 2010 revision concluded that Eocarcinus could not be accommodated among the Brachyura, and was instead transferred to the Anomura. However, a 2020 reanalysis found that it was again the earliest known stem-group crab, but that it had not undergone the process of carcinisation.

References

Anomura
Jurassic crustaceans
Monotypic arthropod genera
Fossils of Great Britain